Montserrat Boix Piqué (born 26 January 1960) is a Spanish journalist, considered among the most influential women in her country. In early 2000, she created and developed the concepts of social cyberfeminism, and a year later those of feminist hacktivism. Another of her main areas of work is gender violence and communication. She has also stood out as a defender of the right to communication and citizenship rights for women. Since 1986, she has been a journalist for the Information Services of Televisión Española (TVE), in the international section.

Biography and career
Montserrat Boix holds a licentiate in Information Sciences from the Autonomous University of Barcelona.

She later moved to Madrid to join the program Encarna de noche, directed by Encarna Sánchez on COPE Madrid. In 1983 she worked on the production of TV3's year-end special directed by Abili Roma. In 1986 she joined TVE's information services, specializing in foreign policy issues and the Arab world, Maghreb, Sahel, and Islamic movements, and jihadist terrorism. She was a special correspondent in Algeria in the early 1990s, covering information about massacres by the GIA and the country's civil war, in Sahrawi refugee camps, Morocco, Egypt, Afghanistan, Guatemala, and Bangladesh.

In addition to the practice of journalism, she is a professor in Master's programs on equality, technology, communication, and development with a gender perspective at various universities, including the International University of Andalucía and the University of the Basque Country. She researches, in turn, how technologies serve as a tool for a new, more immediate, global, and democratized journalism.

Social cyberfeminism
In 2002, Boix published "Los géneros de la red: los ciberfeminismos" with feminist philosopher Ana de Miguel in the book The role of humanity in the information age. A Latin Perspective, published by the University of Chile. This was the first work to articulate the concept of "social cyberfeminism".

In November 2006, in the publication Labrys no. 10, she poses the concept of feminist hacktivism in the essay "Hackeando el patriarcado: La lucha contra la violencia hacia las mujeres como nexo. Filosofía y práctica de Mujeres en Red desde el ciberfeminismo socia" (Hacking the Patriarchy: The Struggle Against Violence Against Women as a Nexus. Philosophy and Practice of Women on the Net from Social Cyberfeminism).

Mujeres en Red
In 1996, Montserrat Boix created Mujeres en Red, a feminist periodical.

Awards and recognitions
 2000: AMECO Communication Award
 2001: , given by the PSOE's Secretary of Equality
 2005: Recognition Award for journalistic work distinguished by the eradication of gender violence, given by the General Council of the Judiciary's Observatory Against Domestic Violence
 2009:  for her effort and perseverance in making Mujeres en Red one of the media of reference in the defense of women's rights
 2011: 7th Isonomía Award against gender violence, Isonomía Foundation/Jaume I University
 2015: Non-Sexist Communication Award, Association of Women Journalists of Catalonia
 2016: Chosen by Mujer Hoy magazine as one of "Spain's 100 Most Influential Women"
 2016, 2017: Included on the newspaper El Mundos list of Spain's 500 most influential women
 2017: 10th Creating Spaces of Equality Award in the Communication category, given by the Women's Council of the Municipality of Madrid

Publications

References

Further reading

External links

 

1960 births
21st-century Spanish women writers
Autonomous University of Barcelona alumni
Journalists from Catalonia
Gender studies academics
Living people
Open source advocates
People from Vallès Occidental
Spanish feminists
Spanish feminist writers
Spanish journalists
Spanish women journalists
Spanish women's rights activists
Academic staff of the University of the Basque Country